Ramalloor is a small space located in the eastern part of kothamangalam.  This is a junction on the road from Kothamangalam to Thateekkadu. 

There is a lower primary school in the heart of the junction - Sacred Heart Lower Primary School (called SHLPS Ramalloor).  It is an aided school of Kerala government.  The management of the school is St. George Cathedral Kothamangalam.  The school is maintained by the Sisters of Carmaleetha Holy House Ramalloor.  It is a small school but it has a great history of 90 years.  It is the first school of many peoples all over Kothamangalam. The number of students is below 300.

There is a small church here St. Jude Kappola (church) near the school. Every year in the middle of November there is a festival here. All the peoples in Ramalloor from all the religions come and enjoy the festival.

The correct position of the junction is 10° 04’ 35.94" N and 76° 37' 45.53" E. 

There are about three Residence associations here - Evergreen, Pratheeksha and St. Jude Nagar.

References 

Villages in Ernakulam district